Liberty Belle and the Black Diamond Express, the fourth album by The Go-Betweens, was released in March 1986 in the UK on Beggars Banquet Records, the record label that would release the remainder of the original group's LPs through their break-up in 1989. The album was recorded at Berry Street Studios in London, England.  The original release consisted of ten songs. The UK CD release in 1986 (BEGA 72) had the original ten tracks, plus two bonus tracks: "The Life At Hand" and "Little Joe". In 2004, LO-MAX Records released an expanded CD which included a second disc of eleven bonus tracks and music videos for the songs "Spring Rain" and "Head Full of Steam" (Single Version).

Details
The band had signed a deal with an English branch of the label Elektra, which closed two weeks into the album's recording. Robert Forster said, "Elektra pays for the record and doesn't even know it. We've got an album that's ours, we can sell it to anyone. Free album." Soon after, they signed with Beggars Banquet.

Drummer Lindy Morrison later said, "This is my favourite album. This is a really, really fabulous album. We produced this ourselves and it's got the best songs, and I think every single song is a classic. And if we had produced those songs the way radio demands – like, if we'd used drum machines and just had synthesisers do must the stuff – I think we could have got a hit."

The band entered the studio determined to create the album they envisioned. Forster later wrote, "If this was to be our last shot, it had to be on our terms. There'd be no drum machines, no piecemeal recording, no acquiescence to higher authority. Our intention was to expand on the crisp, woody sound of Before Hollywood, to include a grander, more exotic range of instrumentation."

Both Grant McLennan and Forster praised the contributions of Dean B. Speedwell. McLennan said, "We used another person on that record, like we had on Before Hollywood, a kind of keyboard-y dude called Dean B. Speedwell, and he was such a musician that we could say 'Well, we want vibes like Lionel Hampton' and he could do it, or we wanted a bassoon part and he could play it."

Later McLennan said, "There was quite a fundamental musical change in the band towards simplification. Something we've been accused of in the past, of being almost a pop band, almost an art band, you know, now we're simplifying. Thinking more of 4/4." Similarly. Forster claimed to have had a revelation in the wake of Spring Hill Fair. He said, "I'm writing a lot less complicated music, and it's giving me space to put myself in it."

Reception

In his review for The Village Voice, Robert Christgau wrote that "there are no popsters writing stronger personal love songs. I doubt there are any page poets envisioning more plangently, either." BBC Music said, "If you like lyrics, and rambling imagery, you'll love these songs. There are ten of them in thirty six minutes. Only the flat production lets them down; something they often had trouble with. But alongside Spring Hill Fair this is their best album."

AllMusic noted, "Robert Forster's endearingly fey persona, equal parts Bryan Ferry and gangly bookstore clerk, reaches full flower on the Go-Betweens' fourth album, which tempers the angularity and occasional claustrophobia of the band's previous work with a new airiness and nervous romanticism. The lighter sound can be partly attributed to the growing influence of co-leader Grant McLennan." Mojo said the album was "organic, homespun, with echoes of Australian country in its classicist rock novellas".

Track listing

Release history

Personnel
 The Go-Betweens
 Robert Forster — vocals, rhythm guitar
 Grant McLennan — vocals, lead guitar, loops, treatments
 Lindy Morrison — drums
 Robert Vickers — bass guitar
Additional musicians
 Dean B. Speedwell — organ, piano, accordion, vibes, bassoon
 Audrey Riley — cello, string arrangements
 Chris Tomlin — 1st violin
 Sally Herbert — 2nd violin
 Sue Dench — viola
 Tracey Thorn — backing vocals on "Head Full of Steam" and "Apology Accepted"
 Richard Preston — loops, treatments on "Reunion Dinner"

References

The Go-Betweens albums
1986 albums
Beggars Banquet Records albums
Albums recorded at Berry Street Studio